Auguste Escoffier School of Culinary Arts is a private culinary school with campuses in Boulder, Colorado, Austin, Texas, and online. The school offers culinary arts, pastry arts, and plant-based programs. It is named after Auguste Escoffier, a French chef who is regarded  as the father of modern haute cuisine, and owned by Triumph Higher Education group.

History 
Auguste Escoffier School of Culinary Arts was founded in 2011 when it acquired the former Culinary School of the Rockies in Boulder, Colorado. Shortly after that merger, the school purchased an additional campus in Austin, Texas. The school is named after Auguste Escoffier, the French chef who is regarded as the father of modern haute cuisine, and known for creating the kitchen brigade system , à la carte menu and the mother sauces  . The school is affiliated with the Auguste Escoffier Foundation, and Le Musee Escoffier de l’Art Culinaire. Michel Escoffier, the great grandson of Auguste Escoffier, is a member of the parent corporation's advisory board.

Academics
Auguste Escoffier School of Culinary Arts in Boulder, Colorado is accredited by the Accrediting Council for Continuing Education and Training (ACCET) and approved and regulated by the Colorado Department of Higher Education, Division of Private Occupational Schools.

Auguste Escoffier School of Culinary Arts in Austin, Texas is nationally accredited by the Council on Occupational Education (COE), is approved and regulated by the Texas Workforce Commission-Career Schools and Colleges, and is authorized as an Associate of Applied Science degree–granting institution through the Texas Higher Education Coordinating Board. 

The schools are also members of a number of the International Association of Culinary Professionals, World Association of Chefs Societies, National Restaurant Association, and ServSafe. The Culinary Arts program in Austin is programmatically accredited by the American Culinary Federation's Educational Foundation.

Programs  

The pastry arts program  at the Austin campus is a 60-week course issuing an associate degree in Applied Science in Pastry Arts program. In Boulder, the pastry Arts diploma program offered at the Boulder campus is a 32-week course.

Online 
Offered through the Boulder campus, the Diploma in Culinary Arts and Operations program is a 15-month long accredited program. The program requires a 6-week industry externship. Additionally, there's a 13-month Diploma in Professional Pastry Arts program.

External links
  Official website

References

1991 establishments in Colorado
2011 establishments in Texas
Cooking schools in the United States
Education in Austin, Texas
Education in Boulder, Colorado
Educational institutions established in 1991
Educational institutions established in 2011
Private universities and colleges in Colorado
Private universities and colleges in Texas